Enna is a city in Sicily. The word may also refer to:
Enna (stream), in the Bergamo Alps of Italy
Enna (spider), a genus of spiders
Enna (software), a media center for Linux developed by the makers of GeeXboX
Enna, the heroine of Enna Burning by Shannon Hale
August Enna, (13 May 1859 – 3 August 1939) a Danish composer.
ICAO code of Lakselv Airport, Banak